Americans in Ecuador consists of immigrants from the United States to Ecuador which includes but is not exclusive to many retirees. It is estimated that about 5,000 to 10,000 American immigrants now live in the country.

Retirement
Cuenca is home to many retirees from all over the United States. They were drawn there by quality health care, a booming social scene and a low cost of living. Americans first came to Cuenca in a slow trickle and many years later a deluge of retirees began settling there. The mayor of Cuenca estimated that about 4,000 Americans are now living there.

Loja is also home to many American retirees who settled there for its scenery and weather. Many retirees there have been accepted into the local community rather than being stereotyped as part of the American enclave.

Education
American schools in Ecuador:
Colegio Americano de Quito
Inter-American Academy of Guayaquil

See also
 Ecuador–United States relations
 Ecuadorian American

References

Ecuador
 
Americans
Ecuador–United States relations